The 2017 ICC World Cricket League Africa Region Qualifiers is an international cricket tournament that is scheduled to take place in Benoni, South Africa. The winner of the qualifiers will progress to ICC WCL Division 5 which will be staged in September 2017.

Teams 
Six teams invited by ICC for the tournament:

Points table 

Source: Cricinfo

Fixtures

References 

2017–19 ICC World Cricket League
2017 in cricket